Enqelab Square is an important square in central Tehran, Iran. It is served by a Metro station of the same name. It sits at the western end of Enqelab Street.

Transportation
  Azadi Street
  Enqelab Street
  Kargar Street
  Tehran BRT Line Enqelab square Station
 Enghelab Metro Station

Squares in Tehran